Pfeiffer Beach is located in the Big Sur region of California. It is one of the most popular beaches on the Central Coast and is well known for Keyhole Rock, a popular photography subject. On a limited number of days in December and January each year, photographers crowd the beach to obtain pictures of the setting sun visible through the arch. Due to the steep terrain prevalent along the Big Sur coast, it is one of the few ocean access points within Big Sur

Limited access 

The road and the beach are within the Los Padres National Forest. The road is named for the Western Sycamores that grow along the road and near the beach. Because it is so narrow, pedestrians and recreational vehicles are not permitted on the road. The Forest Service has a superior easement on the road. There are only five spots along the road where two vehicles can pass each other. Visitor traffic along the road is seven to ten times that of local traffic.

The parking lot accommodates 65 vehicles and is usually full on summer and holiday weekends. When available, parking is $12 per vehicle. During the summer, a shuttle may operate from the US Forest Service headquarters at Big Sur Station to the beach. It is a short walk from the parking lot to the beach.

The beach is open 9:00 a.m. to 8:00 p.m. No camping or fires are permitted. There are four picnic tables available. Swimming can be hazardous due to the cold water, rocks, and strong currents. The weather from June to August can be foggy and cold, known locally as "June Gloom".

Attractions 

The purple color is caused by Manganese garnet that is eroded down from nearby hillsides. Since Pfeiffer Beach is on Federal land, nudity is legal and state nudity laws and state park nudity regulations don't apply. The north end of the beach is sometimes clothing optional.

Eytomology 

The Pfeiffer family built the first home in Sycamore Canyon near the coast in the winter of 1869. Micheal and Barbara Laquet Pfeiffer were on their way to the south coast of Big Sur when they were forced to stop for the season in Sycamore Canyon. They liked the area so much they decided against moving south again the following spring. Their eight children married and lived in the area for several generations. The family established the Pfeiffer Ranch Resort at their home in 1910. An Esslen midden site is near their home.

Their son John and his wife Zulema Florence Swetnam built a cabin near the north bank of the Big Sur River in 1884. John donated the initial  of land that became Pfeiffer Big Sur State Park to the state of California. Pfeiffer Beach is also named for the Pfeiffer family.

References

Santa Lucia Range
Big Sur
Tourist attractions in Monterey County, California
Parks in Monterey County, California
United States Forest Service protected areas
Monterey Ranger District, Los Padres National Forest